Lepidophyma tuxtlae, the Tuxtla tropical night lizard, is a species of lizard in the family Xantusiidae. It is a small lizard found in Mexico. It is native to the Sierra de los Tuxtlas in coastal Veracruz and south and west into northern Oaxaca, southern Veracruz, and northern Chiapas. It is found from 150 to 1,500 meters elevation.

References

Lepidophyma
Endemic reptiles of Mexico
Fauna of Los Tuxtlas
Petén–Veracruz moist forests
Reptiles described in 1957
Taxa named by Frederick A. Shannon